Glauke was a town of ancient Ionia.
During the Peloponnesian War, at some point Athenian ships were lying at Glauce.

Its site is located south of the modern Dipburnu.

References

Populated places in ancient Ionia
Former populated places in Turkey